James George Schaefer (August 30, 1938 – May 29, 2018) was an American politician and a Republican member of the South Dakota House of Representatives. Schaefer was first elected to the state House from District 21 in 2010. Redistricting in 2012 placed him in District 26B, where he won election in 2012, and had served from January 11, 2013 until his death. He lived in Kennebec, South Dakota and was a rancher. Schaefer died, on May 29, 2018, in an UTV accident at his ranch near Kennebec.

Elections
2012 Redistricted to District 26B. As the incumbent Representative, Republican Kim Vanneman left the Legislature and the seat was open, Schaefer was unopposed for the June 5, 2012 Republican Primary. He won the November 6, 2012 General election in the Republican-majority district with 2,981 votes (58.92%) against Democratic nominee Maynard Konechne.
2010 When incumbent Republican Representative Thomas Deadrick was term limited and left a District 21 seat open, Schaefer ran in the three-way June 8, 2010 Republican Primary, placing second with 1,082 votes (32.32%) ahead of Lee Qualm; Qualm was elected to the House District 21 seat in 2012. In the November 2, 2010 General election, Representative Kent Juhnke took the first seat and Schaefer took the second seat with 3,488 votes (25.72%) against Democratic nominees David Reis (a perennial candidate who had sought legislative seats in 2002, 2004, 2006, and 2008) and Norm Cihak.

Death
Jim Schaefer died from an ATV collision on May 29, 2018 on his ranch near Kennebec, SD

References

External links
Official page  at the South Dakota Legislature
Campaign site
 

1938 births
2018 deaths
Place of birth missing
Republican Party members of the South Dakota House of Representatives
People from Lyman County, South Dakota
Ranchers from South Dakota
Road incident deaths in South Dakota
21st-century American politicians